Gerald Oshita (1942–1992) was an American musician, composer, and sound recordist.

Oshita, who was of Japanese ancestry, lived in the San Francisco Bay Area and specialized in unusual wind instruments, particularly those of especially low register.  He performed and recorded with straight alto saxophone, tenor and baritone saxophones, contrabass sarrusophone, and Conn-o-sax, and also made shakuhachi (Japanese bamboo flutes).

Oshita's music drew on elements of jazz as well as contemporary classical music, and was often partly or wholly improvised.  Among the musicians with whom Oshita frequently worked were Roscoe Mitchell and Thomas Buckner, and this trio released two recordings on the 1750 Arch record label.  His work shows the influence of Asian music and philosophy, and he is considered one of the seminal musicians in the development of Asian American jazz.

In 1994, the Gerald Oshita Memorial Fellowship was established in Oshita's memory by an anonymous donor.  The fellowship is presented annually to a composer of Asian, African, Latino, or Native American heritage, and supports a residency at the Djerassi Resident Artists Program on the Program's ranch in Woodside, California.

Discography

Space
with Roscoe Mitchell and Tom Buckner (1750 Arch Records, 1984)

Jam Rice Sextet - Jam Rice Relaxin’ (Frasco, 1976)

Compilation - New Music For Woodwinds And Voice / An Interesting Breakfast Conversation (Mutable Music, 2000)

As sideman
With Roscoe Mitchell
Roscoe Mitchell and the Sound and Space Ensembles (Black Saint, 1983)

External links
Gerald Oshita Memorial Fellowship page on Djerassi Resident Artists Program website

See also
Asian American jazz

American male composers
American male saxophonists
1942 births
1992 deaths
American musicians of Japanese descent
20th-century American composers
20th-century American saxophonists
20th-century American male musicians